John Tyma (born October 13, 1958 in Cleveland, Ohio) is a retired American soccer forward who played professionally in the North American Soccer League and Major Indoor Soccer League.

Youth
Tyma graduated from Brecksville-Broadview Heights High School where he was member of the 1976 Ohio State High School soccer championship team.  He finished his high school career with 76 goals and 23 assists and was a 1975 and 1976 First Team All State player.  Tyma attended Cleveland State University where he played on the men's soccer team from 1976 to 1979.  He was inducted into the Cleveland State Athletic Hall of Fame in 1997.

Professional
In 1980, Tyma turned professional with the Chicago Sting of the North American Soccer League.  On March 31, 1982, the Sting traded Tyma, Dave Huson and their 1983 third round draft pick to the Tulsa Roughnecks in exchange for Duncan McKenzie. Tyma played five games for the Roughnecks.  On June 13, 1982, the Roughnecks Tyma and Tim Twellman to the Sting in exchange for Tasso Koutsoukos.  In the winter of 1982–1983, the Sting played in the Major Indoor Soccer League.

He was inducted into the Illinois State Soccer Association Hall of Fame in 1992.

References

External links
 NASL/MISL stats

1958 births
Living people
American soccer players
Chicago Sting (MISL) players
Chicago Sting (NASL) players
Cleveland State Vikings men's soccer players
Major Indoor Soccer League (1978–1992) players
North American Soccer League (1968–1984) indoor players
North American Soccer League (1968–1984) players
Tulsa Roughnecks (1978–1984) players
Soccer players from Cleveland
Association football forwards